Christopher Owen Ward (born 1954) is an American civil servant who served as executive director of the Port Authority of New York and New Jersey from May 1, 2008, until November 1, 2011, and as New York City Department of Environmental Protection commissioner from 2002 to 2005.

Early life
Ward was born in Princeton, New Jersey, on October 11, 1954, the son of Barbara Carnes and John William Ward. His father was chair of the Special Program in American Civilization at Princeton University, and later served as president of Amherst College 1971–1979, making it co-educational. His father also ran the Ward Commission to investigate political corruption in construction contracts in Massachusetts. He was appointed by Michael Dukakis.

Ward attended Macalester College in Saint Paul, Minnesota, earning a Bachelor of Arts degree in 1976. He worked on an oil rig, for Pennzoil, in the Gulf of Mexico, as a mechanic, before attending Harvard Divinity School, where he received a Master of Theological Studies. Ward's elder brother is David C. Ward. He is married to Pamela Cook. They have two children, Katherine and John.

New York City official
During the Ed Koch administration, Ward worked at the New York City Department of Consumer Affairs as director of research from 1982 to 1988. From 1988 to 1992, he was an assistant commissioner for the New York City Department of Telecommunications and Energy. As part of the administration of David Dinkins, the first African American mayor of NYC, Ward worked on the city's negotiations with Con Edison and Hydro-Quebec regarding the expansion of the hydropower system in Northern Canada. Continuing his service to Mayor Dinkins, he worked as senior vice president for transportation and commerce at the New York City Economic Development Corporation (NYCEDC) from 1992 to 1995. During his tenure at the NYCEDC, Ward worked on acquiring the Staten Island Railroad to re-establish rail freight service to the Howland Hook Marine Terminal. This acquisition was secured with funding obtained by Congresswoman Susan Molinari, "this means that there will be an alternative to New Jersey that will bring about enhanced competition and will also allow the regional port to grow".

Ward served as the commissioner of the New York City Department of Environmental Protection, appointed by Michael Bloomberg, from 2002 to 2005. As commissioner, he worked on the Long Island Sound Nitrogen Reduction Program, federal approval of the Filtration Avoidance Agreement for the Protection and Water Quality of the Upstate Reservoir System, and the funding and completion of the Manhattan segment of the third water tunnel.

Port Authority of New York and New Jersey
From 1997 to 2002, he was chief external affairs and director of port development for the Port Authority of New York and New Jersey, under Executive Directors Robert E. Boyle and Neil Levin. Ward oversaw the development of the comprehensive port development plan and the 50 foot channeling project throughout the Port of New York and New Jersey. In addition, Ward also oversaw the approval of the longstanding Airtrain to JFK Airport. Ward is a survivor of the 9/11 attack.

After David Paterson assumed the governorship he recommended Ward to become executive director of the Port Authority. Ward was appointed to the position on May 1, 2008. Ward served under both Governor David Paterson and Governor Andrew Cuomo. He resigned from the job in November 2011. He was followed by Cuomo appointee, Pat Foye.

While executive director of the Port Authority Ward was charged with overseeing the planned expansion of Pennsylvania Station to the James Farley Post Office, known as the Moynihan Train Hall. In July 2008 Ward announced that construction at the World Trade Center site would run longer and cost significantly more than previously promised. A new, more accurate timetable was delivered, and the 9/11 Memorial was ready for the 10th anniversary. Ward was responsible for the initiation and the renovation of LaGuardia Airport, as well as, the replacement of Delta Air Lines terminal 3 at JFK, and finally the long-term lease commitment by Mediterranean Shipping Company (MSC) at Elizabeth Marine Terminal. Ward advocated for Access to the Region's Core, in order to expand mass transit capacity across New York and New Jersey. New Jersey Governor Chris Christie nixed the project, delaying the opportunity to build a new tunnel across the Hudson River.

Private sector
Ward worked in the private sector as director of Business Development of American Stevedoring, a shipping company based in Red Hook, Brooklyn, from 1996 to 1997. Ward returned to the private sector, as CEO of American Stevedoring, from 2005 to 2006. Ward then moved on to work as the managing director of the General Contractors Association of New York, Inc. (GCA).

Ward's work, since leaving the PANYNJ and re-entering the private sector, has been focused on expanding MWBE (Minority and Women Owned Business Enterprises Program) business, and continuing to improve New York City environmental infrastructure, "the city is bedeviled by intracity truck trips". In the role of chairman of the Waterfront Alliance, Ward advocates for a more accessible New York-New Jersey Harbor Estuary as well as a long term resilience strategy in the face of climate change. Ward is on the board of Four Freedoms Park.

References

External links 
Official biography, Port Authority of New York and New Jersey

1954 births
Living people
Macalester College alumni
Harvard Divinity School alumni
Activists from New York (state)
Port Authority of New York and New Jersey people
People from Princeton, New Jersey
People from New York City
New York (state) Democrats
Commissioners in New York City
History of Manhattan
American civil servants
American real estate businesspeople
American environmentalists
David Paterson
World Trade Center